Amos Dewon Day (born September 29, 1980) is a former Major League Baseball relief pitcher who was drafted by the Toronto Blue Jays. He was then taken by the White Sox via the Rule 5 draft in 2005. Day appeared in 13 games over a two-month span in which he often struggled, posting an ERA of 11.25 and recording more walks than strikeouts.

Day was claimed off waivers by the Red Sox after the  season. He was later claimed off waivers again, this time by the Tampa Bay Rays. Day was released by the Rays organization. On July 3, 2009, Day was signed to a minor league contract by the Oakland Athletics on July 11. In 2010, he signed to play for the Newark Bears of the Atlantic League.

Day attended Southern University.

Personal 
Dewon is currently living in New Jersey working as a Sales Representative for Nike Golf.

References

External links

1980 births
Living people
Major League Baseball pitchers
Birmingham Barons players
Chicago White Sox players
Baseball players from Mississippi
African-American baseball players
Pulaski Blue Jays players
Auburn Doubledays players
Lansing Lugnuts players
Winston-Salem Warthogs players
Charlotte Knights players
Midland RockHounds players
Durham Bulls players
York Revolution players
Jackson State Tigers baseball players
Southern Jaguars baseball players
Southern Maryland Blue Crabs players
21st-century African-American sportspeople
20th-century African-American people